Sierra de Cayey is a mountain range in the main island of Puerto Rico. It is located in the southeast section of the island. Its elevations do not exceed 1000 m (3,280 ft.).

The Grande de Loíza, which is one of the most important rivers in Puerto Rico, has its sources in this range within the municipality of San Lorenzo. The La Plata River flows through the Cayey Valley where the town of Cayey is located on the northern slope of the range. There are tobacco and coffee crops in the area.

Highest summits 
The following peaks are some of the highest summits in the Sierra de Cayey:

 Cerro La Santa - 2,962 ft. (903 m)
 Cerro Lucero - 2,831 ft. (862 m)
 Cerro de la Tabla - 2,808 ft. (855 m)
 Cerro Honoré - 2,795 ft. (851 m)
 Cerro Avispa - 2,778 ft. (846 m)
 Cerro Las Tetas - 2,759 ft. (840 m)
 Monte El Gato - 2,673 ft. (814 m)
 Peña Domingo - 2,637 ft. (803 m)
 Peñon de los Soldados - 2,552 ft. (777 m)
 Cerro Planada - 2,480 ft. (755 m)
Other notable mountains in the Sierra de Cayey are the Cerro Gregorio, Cerro Las Piñas, the Sierra de Jájome and Piedra de Degetau.

References

Mountain ranges of Puerto Rico